The Big Shot is a 1922 German silent film directed by Georg Jacoby and starring Hugo Fischer-Köppe, Wilhelm Diegelmann, and Hugo Döblin.

Plot summary

Cast

References

External links
 

Films of the Weimar Republic
German silent feature films
Films directed by Georg Jacoby
German black-and-white films
1920s German films